Rittersdorf is a municipality in the district of Bitburg-Prüm, in Rhineland-Palatinate, western Germany, a few miles from Bitburg.

The tenth-century Burg Rittersdorf (Rittersdorf Castle) in Rittersdorf nowadays houses a restaurant and a small museum.

References

Bitburg-Prüm